Lukung is a village located on the banks of Pangong Tso, near Line of Actual Control in the Leh District, Ladakh.

Location 
Lukung is located 142 km east of Leh and is known as Gateway to Pangong Tso.

Gallery

References 

Villages in Durbuk tehsil